Leucauge subblanda is one of several species of orchard spider found in Russia (Far East), China, Korea, Taiwan, and Japan.

References

subblanda
Spiders described in 1842
Chelicerates of Japan
Spiders of Asia